Sang-eun, also spelled Sang-un, is a Korean unisex given name. Its meaning differs based on the hanja used to write each syllable of the name. There are 35 hanja with the reading "sang" and 26 hanja with the reading "eun" on the South Korean government's official list of hanja which may be used in given names.

People with this name include:
Lee Tzsche (born 1970), South Korean female singer-songwriter
Lee Sang-eun (born 1975), South Korean female handball player 
Oh Sang-eun (born 1977), South Korean male table tennis player
Kim Sang-eun (born 1978), stage name Lee Ji-ah, South Korean actress

See also
List of Korean given names

References

Korean unisex given names